OGLE-2005-BLG-071Lb is a planet discovered by the Optical Gravitational Lensing Experiment (OGLE) and others in 2005, using gravitational microlensing. According to the best fit model, it has about 3.5 times the mass of Jupiter and a projected separation of 3.6 astronomical units from the star. This would result in an effective temperature around 50 K, similar to that of Neptune. However, an alternative model which gives a slightly lower mass of 3.3 times that of Jupiter and a projected separation of 2.1 AU is only slightly less likely. It may be the most massive planet currently known around a red dwarf star (though only lower limits are known for those planets detected by the radial velocity method).

See also
 Optical Gravitational Lensing Experiment or OGLE

References

Exoplanets discovered in 2005
Giant planets
Scorpius (constellation)
Exoplanets detected by microlensing